Muhu Parish is a rural municipality of Estonia, in Saare County.

Geography 
Muhu Parish is located on Muhu or Muhumaa and its neighbouring smaller islands of Kesselaid, Viirelaid, Võilaid and Suurlaid. It is located in the West Estonian archipelago and part of Saare County in the northeast of it. The main island, Muhu, is the third-largest island under the jurisdiction of Estonia. It touches the Baltic Sea. Muhu Parish is separated from mainland Estonia by the Suur Strait (Moonsund) and Saaremaa island by the Väike Strait.

Religion

Settlements 
There are 52 villages (küla) in Muhu Parish. The villages are: Aljava, Hellamaa, Igaküla, Kallaste, Kantsi, Kapi, Kesse, Koguva, Kuviastu, Külasema, Laheküla, Lalli, Leeskopa, Lehtmetsa, Lepiku, Levalõpme, Liiva, Linnuse, Lõetsa, Mäla, Mõega, Mõisaküla, Nautse, Nõmmküla, Nurme, Oina, Pädaste, Päelda, Paenase, Pallasmaa, Pärase, Piiri, Põitse, Raegma, Rannaküla, Rässa, Raugi, Rebaski, Ridasi, Rinsi, Rootsivere, Simiste, Soonda, Suuremõisa, Tamse, Tupenurme, Tusti, Vahtraste, Vanamõisa, Viira, Võiküla, Võlla.

Gallery

References